Şəkərli or Shakarly may refer to: 
Şəkərli, Agstafa, Azerbaijan
Şəkərli, Salyan, Azerbaijan